The 2003 Nigerian Senate election in Kebbi State was held on April 12, 2003, to elect members of the Nigerian Senate to represent Kebbi State. Sani Kamba representing Kebbi North, Farouk Bello Bunza representing Kebbi Central and Usman Sanni Sami representing Kebbi South all won on the platform of the All Nigeria Peoples Party.

Overview

Summary

Results

Kebbi North 
The election was won by Sani Kamba of the All Nigeria Peoples Party.

Kebbi Central 
The election was won by Farouk Bello Bunza of the All Nigeria Peoples Party.

Kebbi South 
The election was won by Usman Sanni Sami of the All Nigeria Peoples Party.

References 

April 2003 events in Nigeria
Kebbi State Senate elections
Keb